Por mis pistolas (aka With My Guns) is a 1968 Mexican comedy western film directed by Miguel M. Delgado and starring Cantinflas and Isela Vega. Vega's film career took off after this film. The film is a satire to the Spaghetti Western genre in vogue in the late 1960s.

Plot
Fidencio Barrenilo (Cantinflas) is an apothecary from a Northern Mexican border town who discovers the property deeds of an old silver mine in Arizona, La Veladora, belonging to his ancestors, and decides to venture Arizona to claim his property. On the way he is captured by a tribe of Apaches and is about to be burned alive, but when the High Chief Caballo Recostado (Manuel Vergara) has a toothache and learns that the prisoner can heal him, he orders Fidencio's release with the condition of healing him. Fidencio takes out his tooth and gets the eternal friendship of the Apache Chief.

After saying goodbye to the Apaches, Fidencio continues on his way to the ranch of his relatives, the Sánchez. In the village, he stays at the hotel of Pat O'Connor (Jorge Rado), who controls the town through the terror imposed by a gang of gunmen he has at his command. Thanks to the fact that his room is next to Pat's girlfriend, Fidencio learns of his plans to attack his relatives' ranch, and together with the town sheriff, Jim (John Kelly) heads to their ranch to warn them.

Fidencio meets the Sánchez; his uncle Don Serapio (Manuel Alvarado), and the latter's sons and Fidencio's cousins, Pedro (Gregorio Casal), Pablo (Alfonso Mejía) and Lupita (Isela Vega), who welcome him and plan the defense of the ranch with weapons, but Fidencio convinces them to take another plan: give a powerful laxative to the gang of thugs, thus avoiding the assault. In a few days, Fidencio sends to jail Frank (Carlos Cardán), the fierce main enforcer of Pat.

Pat decides to take revenge when his girlfriend tells him that she has heard Fidencio and the Sánchez going in search of La Veladora and decides to crush them right there. When Fidencio, his uncle and his cousins arrive at the mine, Pat and his band appear to usurp the mine, but then Fidencio and Lupita send smoke signals asking the Apaches for help. Caballo Recostado and his Apaches make their appearance and defeat the thugs. The film ends with Feliciano, the Sánchez and the rest of the town holding a celebration party.

Cast
 Cantinflas as Fidencio Barrenillo
 Isela Vega as Lupita Sánchez
 Gloria Coral as Winona
 Quintín Bulnes as Tommy Bernard
 Rhea Frichina as Katie (credited as Rhea)
 Carlos Cardán as Frank
 Ivan J. Rado as Pat O'Connor (credited as Jorge Rado)
 Alfonso Mejía as Pablo Sánchez
 Manuel Alvarado como Don Serapio Sánchez
 John Kelly as Sheriff Jim
 Eduardo Alcaraz as Don Chuchito
 Pedro Galván
 Agustín Isunza as Don Pánfilo
 Carlos Pouliot as Border Agent
 Manuel Vergara as High Chief Caballo Recostado (as Manver)
 Angelita Castagni  
 Arturo Castro
 José Torvay  
 Gregorio Casal as Pedro Sánchez (credited as Jesus Casillas)
 Ricardo Carrión as Willy
 Héctor Carrión as Jimmy
 Farnesio de Bernal as Barman
 Ramón Menéndez as Johnny
 Alberto Catalá as Pianist
 Ramiro Orci as Villain
 Arturo Silva
 José Loza
 Julio Martínez
 Salvador Lozano
 Juan Garza as Gunman

References

Bibliography
 González, Rafael. 60 años de rock mexicano: 1956-1979, Volumen 1. Penguin Random House Grupo Editorial México, 2018.
 Láscaris Comneno, Constantino. Cien casos perdidos. Studium Generale Costarricense, 1984.
 Pilcher, Jeffrey M. Cantinflas and the Chaos of Mexican Modernity. Rowman & Littlefield, 2001.

External links
 

1960s Western (genre) comedy films
1960s parody films
Films directed by Miguel M. Delgado
Films set in Arizona
Mexican Western (genre) comedy films
1968 comedy films
1968 films
1960s Mexican films
1960s Spanish-language films